Charles François Ernest Brune (31 July 1891 – 13 January 1956) was a French veterinarian and politician who served as Minister of PTT in 1950–51 and then as Minister of the Interior in 1951–53.

Life

Charles François Ernest Brune was born on 31 July 1891 in Arbois, Jura.
He became a veterinary doctor.
He spent his whole career in the Ministry of Agriculture.
From 1935 he was municipal councilor of Chartres.
In 1938 he was appointed inspector general of veterinary services.
In 1946 he was elected Councilor of the Republic for Eure-et-Loir.
He was president of the Rally of Left Republicans and of the Democratic Left.
He was elected to the Senate for Eure-et-Loir on 8 December 1946, and was reelected on 7 November 1948 and 19 June 1955. 

Brune was Minister of Posts, Telegraphs, and Telephones from 7 February 1950 to 11 August 1951.
He held this post in the governments of Georges Bidault, Henri Queuille and René Pleven.
He was Minister of the Interior from 11 August 1951 to 28 June 1953.
He held this post in the governments of René Pleven, Edgar Faure, Antoine Pinay and René Mayer.
In the Pinay government Brune and the Minister of Justice, Léon Martinaud-Déplat, were intensely anti-communist and pursued repressive policies.
In 1953 Brune gave the prefect Jean Vaujour responsibility for public security in Algeria, asking him to work with Senator Henri Borgeaud (1895–1963), one of the largest French landowners in the colony and an opponent of all reforms.

Charles Brune died while still a senator on 13 January 1956 in Paris.

Publications

.

Notes

Sources

1891 births
1956 deaths
French Ministers of Posts, Telegraphs, and Telephones
French interior ministers
Senators of Eure-et-Loir